"The Masseuse" is the 73rd episode of the NBC sitcom Seinfeld. It is the ninth episode of the fifth season, and first aired on November 18, 1993. In this episode, Jerry struggles to get his masseuse girlfriend to give him a massage, while George is drawn to how much she dislikes him, and Elaine struggles with the embarrassment of dating a man with the same name as Joel Rifkin.

Plot
Elaine is embarrassed when she dates a man who shares the same name as serial killer Joel Rifkin, and contemplates asking him to change his name. Meanwhile, Jerry is dating Jodi, a masseuse, but is frustrated by her reluctance to give him a massage. George becomes so obsessed over the fact that Jodi dislikes him, he dumps his own girlfriend Karen after she gives him an ultimatum to choose between them.

After Kramer praises Jodi for her massages, Jerry gets fed up and angrily tries to force Jodi to give him the massage, causing a fight. As she storms out she encounters an enamored George, who professes that "she dislikes me so much, it's irresistible".

Joel and Elaine offer a spare ticket to a New York Giants game to Kramer which he must pick up at the Will Call window. When Kramer is unable to produce his ID, the only way for Kramer to receive his ticket is to have the person who left it for him claim it. Joel is paged over the public address system causing everyone sitting around him and Elaine to murmur. Elaine awkwardly explains that "he's not the murderer". Elaine and Joel agree he needs to change his name, but they cannot agree on the names they each have chosen: Remy, Alex, or Todd.

Cultural references
While visiting her boyfriend, Joel Rifkin, Elaine is seen reading an NFL Gameday program. She suggests that many people these days are named "Deion", referencing Deion Sanders.

While brainstorming new first names for Joel, Elaine suggests "O. J." (after O. J. Simpson) as a name that would be less associated with murder. Six months after this episode aired, Simpson was arrested and charged with the double murder of his ex-wife and her friend.

References

External links 
 

Seinfeld (season 5) episodes
1993 American television episodes
New York Giants